Maskoŭskaja (literally: "Moscow station") is a Minsk Metro station. It was opened on June 24, 1984.

The station entrance is near Chelyuskinites Park and close to the Children's Railroad.

Gallery

References 

Minsk Metro stations
Railway stations opened in 1984